Debbie Ford (October 1, 1955 – February 17, 2013) was an American self-help author, coach, lecturer and teacher, most known for The New York Times best-selling book, The Dark Side of the Light Chasers (1998), which aimed to help readers overcome their shadow side with the help of modern psychology and spiritual practices. In following years, she went on to write eight more books including Spiritual Divorce, Why Good People Do Bad Things, and The 21-Day Consciousness Cleanse, which have sold over 1 million copies and been translated into 32 languages. She led workshops on "Shadow Process" and hosted TV and radio shows, and also established the "Ford Institute for Transformational Training".

Career
After Oprah Winfrey discussed Ford's first book, The Dark Side of the Light Chasers (1998), on her show in late 2000, it spent several weeks on The New York Times bestseller list in late 2000 and early 2001. Her other books that made the list were Why Good People Do Bad Things (2008) and The Shadow Effect: Illuminating the Hidden Power of Your True Self (2010), written in collaboration with Deepak Chopra and Marianne Williamson.

Over the years, in a career spanning 20 years, she gave workshops and lectures across the US and trained coaches on the "shadow process". She appeared on Oprah, Good Morning America, Larry King Live, The Big Idea with Donny Deutsch, and Fox & Friends, and was a regular contributor to Oprah.com and Huffington Post. She hosted a weekly talk radio show on Hay House Radio, titled Shadow Talk. She produced and appeared in the documentary The Shadow Effect (2009), and also in 3 Magic Words (2010).

She appeared as a life coach helping people with divorce on ABC's short-lived reality series The Ex-Wives Club (2007). In 2012, she appeared on Super Soul Sunday (Season 2), a talk show hosted by Oprah Winfrey, airing on OWN: The Oprah Winfrey Network in an episode titled "Debbie Ford: Out of the Shadows", in which she talked about her eleven-year-old struggle with cancer.

Ford lived in the seaside community of La Jolla, San Diego County. She died at her home on February 17, 2013, after a prolonged battle with cancer, aged 57.

Works
 Embracing Your Shadow. Hay House, 2002. .
 Spiritual Divorce. Hodder Hb, 2002. .
 Dark Side of the Light Chasers. Hodder & Stoughton, (Reprint) 2011. .
 The Best Year Of Your Life Kit. Hay House, 2005. .
 A Letter from Heaven: God's Gifts to a Mother, Through the Death of Her Daughter, with Allen Guyer. Morris Pub., 2003. .
 Why Good People Do Bad Things. HarperCollins, 2009. .
 The Secret of the Shadow. HarperCollins, 2009. .
 The Right Questions. HarperCollins, 2009. .
 The Best Year of Your Life. HarperCollins, 2009. .
 The Shadow Effect: Illuminating the Hidden Power of Your True Self, with Deepak Chopra, Marianne Williamson. HarperOne, 2010. .
 The 21-Day Consciousness Cleanse: A Breakthrough Program for Connecting with Your Soul's Deepest Purpose. (reprint) HarperCollins, 2010. .
 Courage: Overcoming Fear and Igniting Self-Confidence. Wayne Dyer (Foreword). HarperCollins, 2012. .

References

External links
 The Ford Institute

1955 births
2013 deaths
American self-help writers
American talk radio hosts
American women radio presenters
Deaths from cancer in California
Life coaches
People from La Jolla, San Diego
Place of birth missing
Writers from California
American women non-fiction writers
21st-century American women